Humberto Mansilla Arzola (born 22 May 1996) is a Chilean athlete specialising in the hammer throw. He has won multiple medals at regional level including silvers at the 2017 South American Championships and 2018 South American Games.

His personal best in the event is 80.21 metres set in Cuenca in 2018 (6 kg hammer). His current national record is 77.70 m, set in his hometown in 2021.

He represented Chile at the 2020 Summer Olympics.

International competitions

References

External links
 

1996 births
Living people
Chilean male hammer throwers
Athletes (track and field) at the 2015 Pan American Games
Athletes (track and field) at the 2019 Pan American Games
Athletes (track and field) at the 2018 South American Games
South American Games silver medalists for Chile
South American Games medalists in athletics
Pan American Games silver medalists for Chile
Pan American Games medalists in athletics (track and field)
Medalists at the 2019 Pan American Games
Athletes (track and field) at the 2020 Summer Olympics
Olympic athletes of Chile
People from Temuco
South American Championships in Athletics winners
21st-century Chilean people